Dance Session Album #2 is an album by pianist/bandleader Count Basie recorded in 1954 (with one track from 1952) and originally released on the Clef label. Selections from this album were also released on the 1956 Clef LPs Basie Roars Again and King of Swing.

Reception

AllMusic awarded the album 3 stars.

Track listing
 "Stereophonic" (Ernie Wilkins) - 2:25	
 "Mambo Mist" (Pat "Chico" Barnes) - 4:07 	
 "Sixteen Men Swinging" (Wilkins) - 3:03	
 "She's Just My Size" (Wilkins) - 4:32 	
 "You're Not the Kind" (Count Basie) - 3:19 	
 "I Feel Like a New Man" (Manny Albam) - 2:56 	
 "You for Me" (Neal Hefti) - 3:12 	
 "Soft Drink" (Reunald Jones) - 3:08 	
 "Two for the Blues" (Hefti) - 2:50 	
 "Slow But Sure" (Albam) - 3:45 
Recorded at Fine Sound Studios in New York City on July 26, 1952 (track 5) and August 15, 1954 (tracks 4 & 6–10) and August 16, 1954 (tracks 1–3)

Personnel 
Count Basie - piano, organ
Paul Campbell (track 5), Wendell Culley, Reunald Jones, Thad Jones (tracks 1-4 & 6–10), Joe Newman - trumpet
Henry Coker, Bill Hughes (tracks 1-4 & 6–10), Benny Powell, Jimmy Wilkins (track 5) - trombone 
Marshall Royal - alto saxophone, clarinet 
Ernie Wilkins -  alto saxophone, tenor saxophone, arranger
Eddie "Lockjaw" Davis (track 5), Frank Foster (tracks 1-4 & 6–10), Paul Quinichette (track 5), Frank Wess (tracks 1-4 & 6–10) - tenor saxophone
Charlie Fowlkes - baritone saxophone 
Freddie Green - guitar 
Eddie Jones (tracks 1-4 & 6–10), Jimmy Lewis (track 5) - bass
Gus Johnson - drums
Manny Albam (tracks 6, 8 & 10), Neal Hefti (track 9), Nat Pierce (track 5) - arranger

References 

1955 albums
Count Basie Orchestra albums
Clef Records albums
Verve Records albums
Albums arranged by Ernie Wilkins
Albums arranged by Neal Hefti
Albums produced by Norman Granz